The lieutenant governor of Georgia is a constitutional officer of the State of Georgia, elected to a four-year term by popular vote.  Unlike in some other U.S. states, the lieutenant governor is elected on a separate ticket from the Governor of Georgia.

Constitutionally, the lieutenant governor's primary job is to serve as President of Georgia's Senate. In the case of incapacity of the governor, the lieutenant governor assumes the powers (but not the title) of the Governor.  Should the governor die or otherwise leave office, the lieutenant governor becomes governor for the remainder of the term of office.

The office of Lieutenant Governor was created by a state constitutional revision in 1945.  Prior to that time, Georgia did not have such an office.  Elected in 1946 (for a term to begin in 1947) Georgia's first lieutenant governor, Melvin E. Thompson became involved in the  three governors controversy.

The current lieutenant governor of Georgia is Republican Burt Jones.

Eligibility
Article V, Paragraph IV of the Georgia State Constitution details the qualifications for the office of Georgia's lieutenant governor. In order to be eligible for the office a person must have lived in the United States for 15 years and in Georgia for six years and be at least 30 years old. The Lieutenant Governor of Georgia has no restrictions on the number of times an individual can hold the office.

Role of the lieutenant governor

Duties
The lieutenant governor's formal duties are limited by the Georgia State Constitution to being President of the Senate and the successor of the Governor whenever the governor dies, resigns or is removed from office via impeachment. The lieutenant governor assumes the gubernatorial powers & duties as acting governor, whenever the governor is disabled Other, informal duties, were initiated by Lieutenant Governor Marvin Griffin during his tenure and include naming chairmen to senate committees and "taking an active role in the leadership of the senate." He also began the custom of asking the governor's approval of these appointments. These powers lasted until 2003, when Governor Sonny Perdue, a Republican, stripped the lieutenant governor at the time, Democrat Mark Taylor of those powers, giving them to the president pro tempore of the Senate. In November 2010, the Republican majority voted to change the senate rules, stripping the Lieutenant Governor's ability to appoint the membership of senate committees.

President of the Senate
As President of the Senate the lieutenant governor presides over debate in the Senate and casts a tie-breaking vote in that body if necessary. However, the lieutenant governor is barred from sponsoring legislation. The Rules of the Georgia State Senate assign the president of the Senate to appoint two senators to the Committee on Assignments and to serve as the Chair of the committee, but the Chair may only vote in case of a tie. Additionally, the president is a member of and appoints three other members to the Committee on Administrative Affairs. Under the supervision of the State Senate, the President "shall as a matter of course and without debate, report the reference of bills to the proper committee." Senate pages are supervised by the president who "shall establish a program of familiarization with state government, its procedures and those duties and responsibilities which will be required of pages."

List of lieutenant governors of Georgia
Parties

See also
Georgia Senate
Georgia House of Representatives
Georgia General Assembly

References

External links
 Official Website of the Lieutenant Governor of Georgia

 
Lieutenant Governor